Alexandrina Cabral Barbosa (born 5 May 1986) is a handballer who plays as a left back for BM Morvedre. Born in Portugal, she represents the Spain women's national team.

Personal life
Cabral was born in Lisbon, Portugal, as ninth of 11 siblings. She took up handball in Portugal, but in April 2010 was suspended for two weeks after refusing to attend a training camp. After that she moved to Spain and received Spanish citizenship in June 2012. Whenever possible she wears number 86 during the game because it is the year of her birth.

Career

Club
Barbosa was amongst the top 10 scorers of EHF Women's Champions League in the 2005–06 season playing for CBM Astroc Sagunto, with 46 goals in the old format of the competition.

Playing for SD Itxako, she was the fifth best goal scorer of EHF Champions League in the 2010–11 season and fourth in 2011–12.

In April 2012, she signed for Romanian top club CS Oltchim Râmnicu Vâlcea.

International
In 2012, after playing for many years in Spain, she obtained Spanish citizenship and decided to represent Spain on the international level.

Achievements
Spanish Championship:
Winner: 2011, 2012
Spanish Cup:
Winner: 2012
Romanian Championship:
Silver Medalist: 2009
EHF Champions League:
Finalist: 2011
Semifinalist: 2006, 2013
Women's EHF Cup:
Winner: 2016
Semifinalist: 2009

Individual awards
Carpathian Trophy Most Valuable Player: 2013
French Championship Best Left Back: 2015, 2016
EHF Cup Winners' Cup Top Scorer: 2015
All-Star Team Best Left back of the World Championship: 2019

References

External links

 

1986 births
Living people
Sportspeople from Lisbon
Portuguese sportspeople of Cape Verdean descent
Naturalised citizens of Spain
Spanish people of Cape Verdean descent
Spanish sportspeople of African descent
Spanish female handball players
Portuguese female handball players
Expatriate handball players
Portuguese expatriate sportspeople in Romania
Spanish expatriate sportspeople in Romania
Spanish expatriate sportspeople in Germany
Spanish expatriate sportspeople in France
Spanish expatriate sportspeople in Russia
SCM Râmnicu Vâlcea (handball) players
Handball players at the 2016 Summer Olympics
Olympic handball players of Spain
Competitors at the 2013 Mediterranean Games
Mediterranean Games competitors for Spain
Handball players at the 2020 Summer Olympics
Portuguese people of Cape Verdean descent